Wayland D. Holyfield (born March 15, 1942) is a prominent American songwriter and leader in the songwriting community. His music has been regarded as a standard for “honest simplicity” in the Nashville writing community.

Personal life
Wayland Holyfield was born in Mallettown, Conway County, Arkansas.  He was educated in Arkansas public schools and attended Hendrix College at Conway, Arkansas before graduating from the University of Arkansas with a degree in marketing in 1965.  Prior to his musical career Holyfield was a wholesale appliance salesman and advertising account manager. He and his wife, Nancy, have three grown children, Greg, Mark and Lee.

Early career
In 1972, Holyfield left Arkansas and moved to Nashville, Tennessee to pursue a songwriting career and his first song was recorded in 1973. He received his first number one hit with "Rednecks, White Socks and Blue Ribbon Beer". In 1975, Holyfield achieved his first solo number one hit "You're My Best Friend" recorded by Don Williams.

In addition to his collaborations with Williams, Holyfield's songs have been recorded by numerous Nashville singers including George Strait, Reba McEntire, Barbara Mandrell, Kathy Mattea, Tammy Wynette, Conway Twitty, Charley Pride, Randy Travis, The Judds, Mark Chesnutt, John Anderson, Mel Street, Gary Allan, Johnny Rodriguez, The Nitty Gritty Dirt Band, The Oak Ridge Boys, Ernest Tubb, Anne Murray and Charly McClain.  During his career Holyfield was writer of over 40 Top Ten hits and 14 #1 hits. Some of his best-known songs are "Could I Have This Dance", "Some Broken Hearts Never Mend", "Til The Rivers All Run Dry", "You're the Best Break This Old Heart Ever Had", "Only Here For a Little While", "Meanwhile", and "Nobody Likes Sad Songs".

In his home state of Arkansas, Holyfield is most famous for his song "Arkansas, You Run Deep In Me" which was written for the 1986 Arkansas Sesquicentennial celebration. It was named one of Arkansas' official state songs in 1987. Holyfield played the song at the inauguration of President Bill Clinton in 1993.

Leadership and awards
Holyfield is the current chairman of the Nashville Songwriters Foundation.  He has been a member of the board of directors of the Nashville Songwriters Association International, (NSAI) for almost 25 years. Since 1990 he has been serving on the ASCAP board of directors, the first Nashville songwriter to do so. And as of 2007 will have served for almost 17 years.

Holyfield received a Grammy Award nomination in 1972 for "Could I Have This Dance" and in 1979, he received the NSAI Presidential Award. Holyfield has won 14 BMI Performance Awards and 16 ASCAP Performance Awards.

Holyfield was the 1983 ASCAP Country Writer of the Year co-winner and in 1992 he was inducted into the Nashville Songwriters Hall of Fame and to the Arkansas Entertainers Hall of Fame.

References

External links
 Lyrics to "Arkansas (You Run Deep In Me)", from Arkansas Secretary of State's website
 Wayland Holyfield Interview - NAMM Oral History Library (2013)

1942 births
Living people
American country songwriters
American male songwriters
People from Conway County, Arkansas
Songwriters from Arkansas
University of Arkansas alumni